Amra Sadiković was the defending champion, having won the event in 2012, but chose not to participate in 2013.

Jeļena Ostapenko won the tournament, defeating Susanne Celik in the final, 7–5, 4–6, 7–5.

Seeds

Main draw

Finals

Top half

Bottom half

References 
 Main draw

2013 ITF Women's Circuit
2013 WS